Perixera anulifera is a species of moth of the family Geometridae. It is found on the Maldives and Sri Lanka.

References

Moths described in 1893
Perixera